Tyler Lafauci (born February 9, 1952) is a former American football player for the LSU Tigers of Louisiana State University (LSU). Mainly playing as an offensive guard, Lafauci was a first-team All-American his senior season in 1973. He was also a first-team All-Southeastern Conference selection in 1973 as well as a second-team selection in 1972. Lafauci also occasionally played as a defensive lineman.

Lafauci was born in New Orleans, Louisiana, and attended De La Salle High School there, where as a senior he was a class triple-A all-state selection as both an offensive and defensive guard and was named the state's outstanding lineman. After college, he became a physical therapist in Baton Rouge. In 1983, Lafauci was inducted into the LSU Athletic Hall of Fame.

References

1950s births
Living people
People from Louisiana
American football offensive guards
Louisiana State University alumni
LSU Tigers football players